Devendra Fadnavis the leader of Bharatiya Janata Party was sworn in the Chief Minister of Maharashtra in October 2014. Here is the list of the ministers of his ministry

Shiv Sena joined the Maharashtra government on 5 December 2014.

Council of Ministers

Cabinet Ministers 

|}

Ministers of State

Former ministers

Ministers by Party

Guardian Ministers

Ministers Region-wise

District wise breakup

References

Bharatiya Janata Party state ministries
2014 in Indian politics
Fadnavis 01
Republican Party of India (Athawale)
Shiv Sena
2014 establishments in Maharashtra
2019 disestablishments in India
Cabinets established in 2014
Cabinets disestablished in 2019